Whine is a live album by Scorn, released on October 21, 1997, through Invisible Records.

Track listing

Personnel 
Eraldo Bernocchi – guitar (2-8)
Anthony Burnham – photography
Chris Greene – mastering
Mick Harris – instruments, mixing, recording

References

External links 
 

1997 live albums
Music in Birmingham, West Midlands
Scorn (band) albums